Kushkabad (also Romanized as Kūshkābād and Kooshk Abad) is a village in Mohajeran Rural District, Lalejin District, Bahar County, Hamadan Province, Iran. At the 2006 census, its population was 1,618, in 368 families.

References 

Populated places in Bahar County